Bill Norman may refer to:
 Bill Norman (baseball), American outfielder, coach, manager and scout in Major League Baseball
 Bill Norman (football manager), English football manager
 Bill Norman (footballer), Australian rules footballer